KNNU (92.3 FM) is a radio station licensed to Antlers, Oklahoma, United States. The station is currently owned by Payne 1 Communications LLC

History
This station was assigned call sign KNNU on December 17, 2009.

References

External links
http://k955.com/payneradiogroup/images/kqik/KQIK-KNNU%20coverage%20map.jpg

NNU
Country radio stations in the United States
Radio stations established in 2015